Galaxy Airlines may refer to:

 Galaxy Airlines (Japan)
 Galaxy Airlines (United States)

See also
 Galaxy Air, defunct Kyrgyz airline
 Galaxy Airways, defunct Greek airline